Deinandra mohavensis, commonly known as Mojave tarplant or Mojave tarweed, is a species of flowering plant in the family Asteraceae.

Description
Deinandra mohavensis  is an annual herb growing 10-100 centimeters (4-40 inches) tall. The stems are hairy and glandular. The leaves are bristly and glandular and smooth-edged or serrated on the edges.

The flower heads are borne in clusters or somewhat open arrangements. The heads are lined with very glandular phyllaries. Each contains five yellow ray florets, each about half a centimeter long, and six yellow disc florets.

Distribution and habitat
The plant is endemic to California. It has a disjunct distribution, occurring in the southernmost Sierra Nevada, the Mojave Desert, the Peninsular Ranges, and possibly the San Bernardino Mountains.<ref name=eflora>Jepson eFlora: Deinandra mohavensis] . accessed 4.15.2015</ref>Calflora taxon report, University of California, Deinandra mohavensis  (Keck) B.G. Baldwin, Mojave tarplant  It grows in moist areas in chaparral and riparian zone habitat.

Conservation
This plant was considered extinct for over 50 years because its historical populations had disappeared. It was rediscovered in 1994 in the San Jacinto Mountains.

References

External links
Calflora Database: Deinandra mohavensis (Mojave tarplant)
Jepson eFlora (TJM2) Treatment of Deinandra mohavensisArchived: [http://ucjeps.berkeley.edu/cgi-bin/get_JM_treatment.pl?609,1326,1351 Jepson Manual (TJM93): Hemizonia mohavensis'' 
United States Department of Agriculture Plants Profile for Deinandra mohavensis (Mojave tarweed)
Deinandra mohavensis — Calphotos Photo Gallery, University of California

mohavensis
Endemic flora of California
Flora of the California desert regions
Flora of the Sierra Nevada (United States)
Natural history of the California chaparral and woodlands
Natural history of the Mojave Desert
Natural history of the Peninsular Ranges
Flora and fauna of the San Jacinto Mountains
Plants described in 1935